Kuttyil Kurien Mathew  (3 January 1911 – 2 May 1992) was a Judge of the Supreme Court of India highly regarded for his scholarship and for his seminal contribution to the Constitutional and Administrative law in India. He later served as the Tenth Law Commission Chairman and also as the Chairman of the Second Press Commission. He hails from Kuttiyil family of Athirampuzha in Kottayam district, Kerala.

1911 births
1992 deaths
Indian Christians
Saint Thomas Christians
Malayali people
Kerala politicians
Justices of the Supreme Court of India
20th-century Indian judges
Government Law College, Thiruvananthapuram alumni